"Dom som försvann" (translation: Those who disappeared) is a song by Swedish alternative rock band Kent that was released on The hjärta & smärta EP in 2005.

In Norway the song entered the official single chart on week 9 in 2006. Previously it was credited on the chart under the EP, but during four weeks in 2006 "Dom som försvann" was given an entry on the chart. The song was also on Svensktoppen for one week, on 15 January 2006 at 10th place. The music video of the song was directed by Adam Berg, the brother of Joakim Berg.

Charts

References

Kent (band) songs
Songs written by Joakim Berg
2005 songs